Jungle Menace (1937) is the first serial released by Columbia Pictures.

Based on the success of Republic Pictures's 1936 serial Darkest Africa, starring real-life animal trainer Clyde Beatty, Columbia made this exotic jungle serial starring real-life animal collector Frank "Bring 'Em Back Alive" Buck.  Set in the fictional land of Seemang in Asia, Buck plays the role of Frank Hardy, a soldier of fortune who intervenes in and investigates attempts to run a rubber plantation owner and his daughter off their land.

It was directed by Harry L. Fraser and George Melford, and filmed in black and white in California, USA.

In 1946, material from this serial was re-edited into the 70-minute feature film adaptation called Jungle Terror.

Plot
In the Asian province of Seemang, where the Bay of Bengal meets the jungle, Chandler Elliott (John St. Polis) owns a large and prosperous rubber plantation. His attractive daughter, Dorothy (Charlotte Henry), is engaged to neighboring planter Tom Banning (William Bakewell), but troubles are brewing for both plantations. They ship a cargo of rubber on a riverboat to be taken to an ocean port, but the boat is hi-jacked by river pirates. They kill the crew and steal the shipment. This is part of a plot by Jim Murphy (LeRoy Mason), Elliott's plantation manager, and others to force Elliott to sell his plantation. Local explorer Frank Hardy (Frank Buck) determines to find out who is behind the plot.

Filming
In his autobiography, director Harry L. Fraser described filming the scene in Jungle Menace during which a boa constrictor attacks the heroine Dorothy (Charlotte Henry). The villain has tied Dorothy hand and foot and she thrashes wildly, terrified when she suddenly sees the huge snake:

"The snake was in no hurry. Slowly he slithered across the girl's body, while she screamed and struggled. He turned, looking for a spot to slip under her to make his first wrap. I motioned to the reptile crew to get ready, and a split-second later gave them the signal to move in. But now, the maddened snake fought them and did its best to coil around one of the men. Before that happened, however, I had cut, and we had a good cliff-hanger with our terror-stricken heroine to close the episode."

Buck drank heavily on set and was not always sober during filming. Fraser recounts Buck justified it saying “I’d die in the jungle just drinking coffee. I drink martinis, Harry. Keep me going. Now, my problem is where can I get a thermos filled with martinis at six o’clock in the morning?”

Critical reception
Film critics enjoyed the show:
"Kids will love Jungle Menace for its harem-scarum adventure and for the presence of Frank Buck, with his Wild Animals Associates, Inc. Frank Buck plays the hero, Frank Hardy, when gangdom invades the rubber business and river pirates grab off plantation cargo. Plenty of old-time names are in the cast: Reginald Denny is a plantation foreman, Esther Ralston an owner, Charlotte Henry and William Bakewell play young lovers; also featured are Clarence Muse, Willie Fung, Leroy Mason, Richard Tucker, and Duncan Renaldo."

Later critics would question the treatment of animals in the film:
"Shifts in public perception of the increasingly threatened wild and the growing
controversy over the practice of keeping wild animals in captivity have recast many of these
former heroes into villains." Joanne Carol Joys said that a kind of Orientalism was implicit in the film's display of "masculine superiority and dominance over the wilderness with the capability of rendering it submissive and orderly".

Cast

 Frank Buck as Frank Hardy
 Reginald Denny as Ralph Marshall
 LeRoy Mason as Murphy
 Richard Tucker as Robert Banning
 Duncan Renaldo as Roget
 William Bakewell as Tom Banning
 Charlotte Henry as Dorothy Elliott
 Matthew Betz as Det. Lt. Starrett
 Sasha Siemel as 'Tiger' Van Dorn
 George Rosener as The Professor
 John Davidson as Dr. Coleman
 Robert Warwick as DCI Angus MacLeod

Chapters
Each of the fifteen chapters was 20 minutes long and contained plenty of action: "One man defying a thousand deaths in a green hell of creeping horror! The fearless Frank Buck in his most hair-raising role! Merciless killers...a beautiful hostage...a cargo of wild animals run loose when the typhoon strikes! Terrifying adventures torn out of the heart of cruelest Asia!"
The chapter titles are:

 River Pirates
 Deadly Enemies
 Flames of Hate
 One-way Ride
 Man of Mystery
 Shanghaied
 Tiger Eyes
 The Frame-up
 The Cave of Mystery
 Flirting with Death
 Ship of Doom
 Mystery Island
 The Typhoon
 Murder at Sea
 Give 'em Rope
Source:

References
Notes

Bibliography

External links

 
 
 
 
 
 Cinefania.com
 Review of Jungle Menace

1937 films
1937 adventure films
American black-and-white films
1930s English-language films
Columbia Pictures film serials
Films directed by George Melford
Films directed by Harry L. Fraser
American adventure films
1930s American films